Adyanpara Weir is a small diversion dam constructed across Kanjirapuzha River at Adyanpara in Chaliyar panchayath of Kurumbalangode village in Malappuram district of Kerala, India. This weir is a part of Adyanpara SHEP, which envisages development of power by utilizing the potential of Kanjirapuzha stream, a tributary of Chaliyar river. It consist of a diversion weir , desilting chamber of splay type, power tunnel of length 968.50m, an underground surge tank in circular shape. The 3.5 megawatt hydroelectric project has been setup as part of the Small Hydro Electric Project. The water from the weir flows to Kanjirapuzha through the Taluk of Nilambur.

Specifications
 Latitude : 11⁰ 21′ 27 ” N	
Longitude : 76⁰ 11′ 32” E
Panchayath : Chaliyar	
Village : Kurumbalangode
District : Malappuram	
River Basin : Chaliyar	
River : Kanjirapuzha	
Release from Dam to river	: Kanjirapuzha
Taluk through which release flows	: Nilambur
Year of completion : 2015	
Name of Project : Adyanpara Small Hydro Electric Project
Type of Dam	: Concrete – gravity
Classification : Weir
Maximum Water Level (MWL)	EL 202.529 m
Full Reservoir Level ( FRL)	EL 201.11 m
Storage at FRL	Diversion only
Height from deepest foundation	: 5.56 m ( above normal bed level)
Length : 58.0 m ( including core wall)
Spillway : overflow section
Crest Level : EL 201.11 m
River Outlet	Nil
Purpose of Project	Hydro Power

Hydro Electric Project
The Powerstation is in the downstreams from the weir. Water from the Weir flowed through a tunnel which is 976 meter long to a forebay Tank. Water is then channeled through a Penstock pipe to the Power station where there are 3 Generators installed. A total of 3.5 Megawatt Electricity is produced using these 3 generators.

Hydel Tourism
Kerala State Electricity board has set up Hydel Tourism around the Power plant and the dam. Board arranges conducted tours where tourist can have ring side view of the power plant.

External links
Adyanpara SHEP Short film by KSEB

References

Dams in Kerala
Dams completed in 2015